"Somebody Like You" is a song recorded by Australian singer Jimmy Christo. It was released in May 2000 as Christo's debut single and peaked at number 50 on the ARIA charts. The song appeared on the 
The Wog Boy soundtrack.

Track listings 
 Australian CD single (Mushroom – MUSH019452)
 "Somebody Like You" (Single Radio Mix) - 3:55
 "Somebody Like You" (Andy Boy Remix) (Radio Edit) - 3:24
 "Somebody Like You" (Groove Peddlers) (Radio Edit) - 2:54
 "Somebody Like You" (Andy Boy Remix) (Extended Mix) - 5:11
 "Somebody Like You" (Groove Peddlers Club Mix) - 4:43
 "Somebody Like You"  (Mega Mix) - 5:23
 "Somebody Like You" (Lost Vox Mix) - 5:32

Charts

References 

2000 debut singles
2000 songs
Mushroom Records singles